Lewis C. Lang (March 29, 1843 – December 9, 1893) was an American lawyer and politician from New York.

Life 
Lang was born in Potsdam, New York on March 29, 1843. He attended the St. Lawrence Academy (today the State University of New York at Potsdam) in 1860-1861 and Lawrenceville Academy in 1863.

After teaching for several years, Lang studied law under John R. Brinckerhoff of Norfolk and practiced law with him. He later moved to Brasher Falls, where he established a substantial law practice and lived for the rest of his life. He represented the town as a town supervisor. He helped organize a school in Brasher and Winthrop and served on the board of education.

In 1875, Lang was elected to the New York State Assembly as a Republican, representing the St. Lawrence County 3rd District. He served in the Assembly in 1876, 1877, and 1892. While in the Assembly, he proposed a constitutional amendment that would cut off pensions for New York Supreme Court and Court of Appeals judges. He also served as district attorney of St. Lawrence County from 1882 to 1887.

In 1865, he married Elizabeth Bailey of Massena. They had one daughter, Jessie, who married Dr. C. C. Kellum. Elizabeth died in 1888. In 1889, he married Nora O'Brien of Norfolk.

Lang died of complications from rheumatism and Bright's disease on December 9, 1893. He was buried in Fairview Cemetery in Brasher Falls.

References

External links 
 The Political Graveyard
 Lewis C. Lang at Find a Grave

New York (state) lawyers
Town supervisors in New York (state)
School board members in New York (state)
Republican Party members of the New York State Assembly
19th-century American politicians
St. Lawrence County district attorneys
People from St. Lawrence County, New York
State University of New York at Potsdam alumni
1843 births
1893 deaths
People from Potsdam, New York
Deaths from nephritis
Burials in New York (state)
19th-century American lawyers